Hotel Upton, also known as Grand Coulee Hotel and Grand Coulee Apartments, is a historic four-story building in Spokane, Washington. It was designed by Loren L. Rand, and built as a 102-room hotel in 1910. It was renamed the Grand Coulee Hotel in 1933. It has been listed on the National Register of Historic Places since July 29, 1994.  It is one of three historic buildings at the intersection of First Avenue and Cedar Street listed on the NRHP. To the east across Cedar is the Eldridge Building and to the north across First is the former Carnegie Library.

References

Hotel buildings completed in 1910
National Register of Historic Places in Spokane County, Washington
Late 19th and Early 20th Century American Movements architecture